Sudarshan Bhagat (born 20 October 1969) is an Indian politician Bharatiya Janata Party. He is a member of the Indian Parliament, and currently represents Lohardaga (Lok Sabha constituency). He is the Minister of State for Tribal Affairs in the Narendra Modi government.

References

External links
Official biographical sketch in Parliament of India website

1969 births
Living people
India MPs 2009–2014
Lok Sabha members from Jharkhand
People from Lohardaga district
India MPs 2014–2019
Bharatiya Janata Party politicians from Jharkhand
Narendra Modi ministry
India MPs 2019–present